State Highway 371 (SH 371) is a  state highway in Conejos and Alamosa counties in Colorado, United States, that connects Colorado State Highway 15 (SH 15), east of Capulin, with Colorado State Highway 368 (SH 368) east of Estrella.

Route description
From its southern teriminus it heads due north as a two–lane road through an rural agriculture area for the length of its course. Approximately  along it course, SH 371 crosses the Alamosa River and then crosses or connects with several county roads.

(CR DD heads west, while SH 368 heads east toward U.S. Route 285 and Estrella. SH 368 continues north toward Colorado State Highway 370 and Monte Vista.)

Major intersections

See also

 List of state highways in Colorado

References

External links

371
Transportation in Alamosa County, Colorado
Transportation in Conejos County, Colorado